Eldred De Bracton Norman (9 January 1914 – 28 June 1971) was an Australian inventor and racing-car driver.

Norman was born in Adelaide, South Australia, the second of six children to Australian-born parents William Ashley Norman (a solicitor) and his wife Alma Janet née Matthews. He attended Scotch College, Adelaide. On 15 May 1941 Norman married Nancy Cato, then a 24-year-old journalist.

Eldred was notably famous for producing sliding vane superchargers.  The rare and iconic supercharger started as a base model, the Type 65 and is highly sought after in the early Holden community.  The Type 65 was a bolt on performance enhancing product to suit the Holden Grey motor.

Norman built and modified cars. He contested the Australian Grand Prix several times; he was leading the 1951 Australian Grand Prix when his twin V8 engined Ford suffered mechanical failure. He finished fourth in the 1954 Australian Grand Prix.

In 1956 Norman retired from motor racing and focussed on inventing, but his prototypes did not reach production. He died in Noosa Heads, Queensland.

References

External links
Memories of Eldred Norman by Bill Norman
Supercharge a book by Eldred Norman

1914 births
1971 deaths
20th-century Australian inventors
Racing drivers from South Australia